Arpit Pannu (born 24 April 1996) is an Indian cricketer. He made his first-class debut for Punjab in the 2018–19 Ranji Trophy on 1 November 2018. He made his List A debut on 14 October 2019, for Chandigarh in the 2019–20 Vijay Hazare Trophy. He made his Twenty20 debut on 5 November 2021, for Chandigarh in the 2021–22 Syed Mushtaq Ali Trophy.

References

External links
 

1996 births
Living people
Indian cricketers
Chandigarh cricketers
Punjab, India cricketers
Place of birth missing (living people)